Foam is a substance that is formed by trapping gas bubbles in a liquid or solid.
Foam may also refer to:

Military
 Flag officer#United Kingdom Attached Middle East, a former major command of the Royal Navy
 , a United States Navy trawler and minesweeper in commission from 1918 to 1919

Organizations
 Foam Fotografiemuseum Amsterdam, known as Foam, a photography museum in Amsterdam

Other uses
 Foam (culinary), a modern food preparation and presentation technique
 Foam (film), 2020 short film
 Foam, the schooner that took Frederick Hamilton-Temple-Blackwood, 1st Marquess of Dufferin and Ava (Lord Dufferin) on the 1856 voyage  to Iceland, Jan Mayen, and Spitzbergen, that inspired the book Letters from High Latitudes
 First Office Action on the Merits, a form of Office action in United States patent law
 Foam hand, a sports paraphernalia item
 OpenFOAM, an open source finite volume partial differential equation solver used in a variety of computational fluid dynamics applications
 Free Open Access Medical education, sometimes called FOAMed, a worldwide movement to share medical knowledge and continuing education

See also
 
 
 Foamy (disambiguation)